Angela May Rippon  (born 12 October 1944) is an English television journalist, newsreader, writer and presenter. Rippon presented radio and television news programmes in South West England before moving to BBC One's Nine O'Clock News, becoming a regular presenter in 1975. She was the first female journalist permanently to present the BBC national television news, and the second female news presenter on British television after Barbara Mandell on Independent Television News (ITN) in 1955.

Rippon appeared on a Morecambe and Wise Christmas Show in 1976, presented the first two series of Top Gear and also presented Come Dancing. She hosted the Eurovision Song Contest in 1977. She was a presenter on, and co-founder of, breakfast television franchisee TV-am. In the 1990s, she moved to radio, presenting daily news programmes for LBC Newstalk between 1990 and 1994, and appeared on Channel 4's The Big Breakfast as a stand-in newsreader. She presented the BBC broadcast of the United Kingdom Ballroom Championships at the Bournemouth International Centre in 1991.

Rippon has written fourteen books, toured with a production of Anything Goes and presented a segment of BBC One's The One Show.

Since 2009, she has co-presented the BBC consumer show Rip Off Britain with Gloria Hunniford and Julia Somerville and since 2013, she has co-hosted Holiday Hit Squad on the BBC alongside Helen Skelton and Joe Crowley. She also regularly voices the BBC One game show The Wall.

Currently, she is often seen presenting on GB News as a stand-in presenter for Alastair Stewart.

Early life
Rippon was born in Plymouth, Devon, into a working-class family. Her father, John, was a Royal Marine; she first saw him in 1947 when he returned from World War II. Rippon's Scottish mother, Edna, worked at a fine china company called Lawley's and was also a seamstress. She attended Public Secondary School for Girls, Cobourg Street in Plymouth.

Career
After leaving school at 17, Rippon joined the photographic office of the Western Morning News and worked for the Sunday Independent, and later, BBC local radio and Westward Television as an editor.

Television and radio
When she was 21, Rippon began her television career at BBC South West in Plymouth in 1966, before becoming a reporter for BBC TV news. Rippon first presented a national news programme on BBC2 in 1974. For a fortnight, she replaced newsreader Richard Baker – who was on holiday – on BBC One's Nine O'Clock News, and was offered a permanent newsreading role on that programme in 1975. Rippon was called by newspapers the first female television newsreader. However, ITN's Barbara Mandell predated her, having first appeared on the second night of ITV in 1955; Nan Winton was the first female BBC newsreader in 1960, and Mary Marquis had already been BBC Scotland's main newsreader for a few years. Rippon was the first female journalist to read the news regularly on national television.

In an interview with The Guardian, she said: "You just become an automated autocue reader and if you've half a brain you want an opportunity to use it. When I read the Nine O'Clock News, I kept my brain active by working on programmes like Antiques Roadshow (which she briefly hosted in 1979), Top Gear and In the Country." Rippon was a guest in the 1976 Morecambe and Wise Christmas Show, first appearing behind a BBC newsdesk, then emerging to perform a high-kicking dance routine. Her appearance was so popular she made a cameo appearance in the following year's show, in which she was revealed to be one of a chorus line. Rippon later presented the long-running show Come Dancing.

Rippon hosted the 1977 Eurovision Song Contest at the Wembley Conference Centre in London. She was the first presenter of BBC television's Top Gear, presenting the motoring programme from 1977 to 1979. Rippon appeared briefly on TV-am following its launch in 1983. After a much publicised exit from TV-am (with most of its other founder presenters), she worked as an Arts and Entertainments correspondent for WHDH-TV (then known as WNEV) in Boston, Massachusetts for a brief period.

Rippon co-presented the BBC's coverage of the wedding of the Prince of Wales and Lady Diana Spencer on 29 July 1981 and BBC One's coverage of the 1979 UK general election results. In the mid-1980s, she hosted the quiz show, Masterteam on BBC One, and hosted ITV's revival of the panel game What's My Line? from 1989 to 1990. In 1990, she also hosted a game show, Matchpoint, that was based on tennis format. She also became a regular presenter on BBC Radio 2, often sitting in for Jimmy Young and presenting a seasonal Friday night show from 1986 to 1989.

From 1990 to 1994, she presented Angela Rippon's Morning Report, a daily radio news programme on LBC Newstalk, and, later, Angela Rippon's Drivetime. She was a stand-in newsreader on Channel 4's The Big Breakfast until 2002. In 2005, Rippon co-hosted a series of Sun, Sea and Bargain Spotting for BBC 2 and in April 2006, she toured the UK as a cast member of the musical Anything Goes. In 2007, she became a presenter on Cash in the Attic, a BBC One daytime television programme broadcast where presenters meet members of the general public, who seek out valuables and antiques to be sold at auction, in their homes.

In 1997, Rippon presented the Channel 4 show "Game of War" with co-presenter Paddy Griffith, a programme that re-enacted historic battles on the wargames table with modern-day military commanders re-fighting the battles. The show only aired for three episodes. The battles re-fought were Battle of Naseby (14 June 1645), Battle of Waterloo (18 June 1815) and Battle of Balaklava (25 October 1854).

In 2010, Rippon appeared for one night on the ITV show Dancing on Ice as a judge, covering for Robin Cousins and returned to the show as one of 16 participants in the sixth season on 9 January 2011, with her professional partner, Canadian ice skater Sean Rice. In March 2011, she appeared with Lenny Henry, Samantha Womack and Reggie Yates in a BBC documentary to raise funds for Comic Relief. It was called Famous, Rich and in the Slums, and showed four celebrities travelling to Kibera in Kenya, Africa's largest slum. In 2011 she joined The One Show, presenting a five-minute slot called "Rippon's Britain".

On 19 November 2011, Rippon appeared on Children in Need, performing alongside BBC newsreaders Sian Williams, Susanna Reid, Sophie Raworth, and Emily Maitlis in a special one-off edition of Strictly Come Dancing. In the same month she worked briefly on BBC Radio 5 Live as a stand-in presenter on the Double Take programme.

Rippon joined the BBC again, as a co-presenter on the BBC One show Holiday Hit Squad in 2013, alongside Joe Crowley and Helen Skelton. The show returned for a second series in March 2014.

In 2014, Rippon co-hosted the ITV Saturday night entertainment series Amazing Greys alongside Paddy McGuinness. The show lasted for just one series.  In April 2016, she co-presented the two-part BBC One series How to Stay Young.

In 2018, Rippon was a co-presenter of live coverage of the wedding of Prince Harry and Meghan Markle for Channel Seven (Australia) alongside Michael Usher and Melissa Doyle.

In 2021, on the Christmas episode of Would I Lie to You?, Rippon revealed that her nickname was "Ripps".

In 2022, she provided analysis on the Australian television broadcaster Seven Network's coverage of the death and state funeral of Elizabeth II as a royal commentator.  She has been a stand-in presenter on GB News, first alongside Eamonn Holmes on the breakfast programme, and then on Alistair Stewart and Friends.

Books
In the early 1980s, Rippon wrote a series of children's books about a character called "Victoria Plum" that was published by Purnell and Sons. Victoria Plum was a tree fairy in "the Great Wood". Merchandise and a Christmas annual were released following the second series. In 1982, she wrote a book Mark Phillips, the Man and His Horses, about the Princess Royal's then husband. Rippon has since written keep-fit guides for older people, including Stay Active, Stay Supple, Stay Healthy.

Other activities
Rippon is patron of the Old Time Dance Society. In 2010, she attended the society's 25th Anniversary Ball of the Year. In 2000, Rippon was appointed Chair of English National Ballet. After several years of involvement, she resigned in late 2003 following complaints and briefings about her leadership style, which was described as "schoolmistressy" and "imperious".

Personal life
In 1967 at the age of 22, she married Christopher Dare, an engineer. They separated in 1989, divorcing later. They had no children.

Honours and awards
She was the subject of This Is Your Life in 1981 when she was surprised by Eamonn Andrews while signing copies of her newly published book in a store at the Brent Cross Shopping Centre.

Rippon was appointed Officer of the Order of the British Empire (OBE) in the 2004 Birthday Honours.

Rippon was also awarded an Honorary Doctorate of Arts from Plymouth University in 2012.

She was appointed Commander of the Order of the British Empire (CBE) in the 2017 New Year Honours for services to dementia care in her role as development lead with Dementia Friendly Communities.

Filmography

References

External links
 
 Bio at www.screenonline.org
 Angela Rippon at Knight Ayton Management

1944 births
Living people
BBC newsreaders and journalists
English journalists
British women journalists
English National Ballet
English television presenters
British women television presenters
Commanders of the Order of the British Empire
Mass media people from Plymouth, Devon
Top Gear people
WFTV Award winners
BBC Radio 2 presenters
British women radio presenters
GB News newsreaders and journalists